The Bottom Half is the fifth album from progressive rock group Umphrey's McGee recorded during the band's 2005/2006 sessions of their previous studio effort Safety in Numbers. The first disc contains complete songs that were initially left off the Safety in Numbers album, while the second disc features demos, outtakes, and b-sides from the sessions. Like the previous album, the artwork was done by Storm Thorgerson. The first single from the album is "Bright Lights, Big City," written by Mother Vinegar frontman Karl Engelmann, who is also a member of Ali Baba's Tahini with Umphrey's guitarist Jake Cinninger.

The album was released on April 3, 2007.

Track listing

Disc One

Disc Two
 Words (a capella version)
 Great American / Believe the Lie
 Believe the Lie
 Time Eater
 Never Cease 
 Rocker
 Ready Noodles
 Higgins (instrumental version)
 The Heart of Rock 'N' Roll
 Fresh Start
 The Browning Special
 Ocean Billy
 Intentions Clear
 What Else?
 Alex's House 
 End of the Road
 Red Room Disco
 Rocco 
 WWS
 The Weight Around
 Liquid 
 Atmosfarag
 Words (chorus)
 Memories of Home
 Browning Family Creed
 Biscuits & Gravy
 Words (Intro)
 Words (Instrumental)

Artwork
The sleeve's designer Storm Thorgerson said: "This design was originally rejected by Jane's Addiction (the fools!) and was resurrected at short notice by a band called Umphrey's McGee from Chicago, God bless 'em. We had completed the design despite rejection from Jane's, and UM needed something in a hurry and thought this suitable for their humour and album title, The Bottom Half."

Chart performance

Personnel
 Brendan Bayliss - guitar, vocals
 Jake Cinninger - guitar, Moog, synthesizers, vocals
 Joel Cummins - keyboards, vocals
 Ryan Stasik - bass guitar
 Kris Myers - drums, vocals
 Andy Farag - percussion
 Béla Fleck - banjo
 Chris Hoffman - cello
 Joshua Redman - saxophone

References

Umphrey's McGee albums
2007 albums
Albums with cover art by Storm Thorgerson